Grigory Engelhardt (1759–1834) was a Russian general during the Napoleonic Wars.

Early career
Engelhardt was born into the Courland nobility. On May 6, 1776, he was enrolled in the Izmailovsky Life Guards Regiment as a noncommissioned officer. On December 3, 1779, he transferred to the Nevsky Musketeer Regiment as a lieutenant.

Engelhardt fought in the Russo-Swedish War of 1788–1790 as a captain in the Ryazan Musketeer Regiment. He was wounded in the chest and right thigh at Fredrikshamn, and for his distinguished service was promoted to major. He was made a colonel on October 26, 1798, and a major general on February 5, 1800. On March 15 of that same year he was given the command of the Staroingermanlandskogo Musketeer Regiment.

Campaigns against the French and Turks
Engelhardt participatated in the Austrian campaign and was wounded by shrapnel at Austerlitz. In the 1808-1807 campaign in Prussia and Poland, he was wounded by a bullet in his right leg at Eylau, and at Friedland was badly wounded by shrapnel in his left thigh, left side, and left arm. He was awarded the Order of St. George, third and fourth class, for his distinguished service.

In 1808 he was transferred to the Moldavia/Wallachia region, where he fought the Turks in 1809 through 1811.

1812 and after
In the 1812 campaign, he commanded the 2nd Brigade of the 8th Infantry Division and fought against the Austrians and Poles in Volhynia and in the pursuit of the retreating enemy from Lutsk to Volkovysk. He then fought the French at Garnastaevichy, Volkovysk, and Kamenetz-Zhuravskii.

In 1813, he participated in the capture of Białystok and of Warsaw and fought at Lutzen and Bautzen, where a severe bullet wound in the left thigh caused heavy bleeding which forced him out of the action.

In 1815, Engelhardt participated in the second campaign in France as commander of a brigade in the 8th Infantry Division, and then briefly commanded the 3rd Brigade of the 23rd Infantry Division. Due to his wounds, he retired from the service on February 28, 1816.

Honours and awards
 Order of St. Anne, 1st class with diamonds
 Order of St. George, 3rd class
 Order of St. Vladimir, 2nd class
 Cross of Eylau
 Order of the Red Eagle (Prussia)
 Gold Sword for Bravery with diamonds

External links

1759 births
1834 deaths
Imperial Russian major generals
Russian commanders of the Napoleonic Wars
Recipients of the Order of St. George of the Third Degree
Recipients of the Order of St. Anna, 1st class
Recipients of the Order of St. Vladimir, 2nd class
Recipients of the Gold Sword for Bravery
Grigori